Haile is a small village and civil parish in Copeland district, in the county of Cumbria, England. It had a population of 617 at the 2011 Census.

Nearby settlements include the town of Egremont and the villages of Thornhill and Beckermet. For transport there is the A595 road nearby. The village stands high, and is exposed to the west winds. The parish is situated near the River Ellen, and comprised the townships of Hale and Wilton.

In 1870-72, John Marius Wilson's Imperial Gazetteer of England and Wales described Haile like this:

"HAILE, or HALE, a parish in Whitehaven district, Cumberland; near Copeland forest, the river Eden, and the Whitehaven and Furness railway, 2½ miles SSE of Egremont. It includes the hamlet of Wilton; and its post town is Egremont, under Whitehaven. Acres, 3, 220."

Historical map

Haile Hall
Haile Hall is the historic seat of the Ponsonby family. It dates from 1591 with later additions.

Haile Parish Church
"Haile Parish Church - a small church nestling in a vale just outside the village of Haile surrounded by a picturesque church yard and mature trees. The little church at Haile, with no dedication, has Georgian plain arched windows, but the walls are medieval. The west porch was added by Ferguson in 1882, and the Church restoration took place mainly in 1883. A South-East quoin in the nave is part of a Saxon cross-shaft, with scrolls. Outside against the West wall is a monument to John Ponsonby (1670, while the window depicting St George and the dragon, is a memorial to a later Ponsonby, who died in 1952. The church is linked with the Egremont Team Ministry. The Rev'd Simon Cake (CA) takes lead responsibility for Haile".

Population

It has a population of 617 according to the 2011 Census. When analyzing the population graph, from 1961 to 2011 the population grew by 500 when comparing the data sets from the Neighborhood Statistics and the Vision of Britain website. However this large scale rise in population isn't truly valid as the two contrasting websites use different boundaries to outline Haile. The Neighborhood Statistics Census highlights Haile as a much larger area than the Vision of Britain site therefore explaining the massive change in population size. This is because of the boundary change in April 1935 transferring an extra 45 acres to the area. Therefore, both websites are accurate for the period they represent.

Occupations
When discussing the occupations of Haile's population, through time it highlights the changes in living during the 130-year period between 1881 and 2011. In 1881 the majority of jobs were in the agricultural sector, having a total of around 70 people out of 266 people in work. There was a high number of unknown occupations for women, which could be because of a lack of information to record these statistics or because their occupations were illegal. Also, during this time the majority of workers were male with 183/266 out of the total workforce. However, comparing the occupations to the 2011 census shows the change in equality in terms of the number of people working, with 164 males and 161 female. The jobs have also shifted from the agricultural sector to the professional and public sector. In 1881, Haile only had 3 people who were known professionals, compared to 108 in 2011. Therefore, in terms of occupations Haile has followed a similar trend to the rest of Britain.

Village Hall
"In 1879 work commenced on a new Haile and Wilton School, which opened in the following year and provided education for the children of the parish until it closed in 1955. The building was then maintained by Haile Church until 1974 when it was transferred to an independent charity and established as Haile Village Hall. It was enlarged and refurbished between 1999 and 2000".

Housing
The total numbers of houses follows a similar trend to the population of Haile, increasing to 59 households in 1931, then declining to 49 in 1961. Due to different defining boundaries according to the Neighborhood statistics in 2011 there were 259 households. In 1921 there was on average 6 rooms per house, whereas in 2011 there were on average 8-9 rooms per household. This shows that household spaces have increased and people have more rooms in their houses than they once did.

The accommodations of Haile in 2011 were mostly detached whole houses or bungalows, having a total of 170 houses out of 259. 41 houses were semi-detached whole houses or bungalows, and 46 were terraced whole houses, flats or bungalows. This is similar to the rest of Britain.

The quality of living and housing in Haile is high, compared to England and Cumbria. Only 0.8% of households are overcrowded based on a standard definition using the numbers of inhabitants and rooms. Vacant housing is slightly higher than the national average, but only 2% have a lack of central heating whereas in England as a whole it is 2.7%. The graph shows that Haile's quality of housing is better than the rest of Cumbria on average.

Education

In Haile a total of 504 people are over 16, with 67 of them gaining no qualifications. This is above the national average. In 2011 22.3% of over 16 residents gained no qualifications, whereas in Haile it is a low 13.3%. On average most people have a level 4 or above qualification (185/504), which is impressive although it's a relatively small area. According to the Office of National Statistics in England, 27% of people over 16 have a level 4 or above qualification, however in Haile it is 36.7%, showing this area is very well educated when compared to the rest of England. Comparing Haile to the 2001 and 2011 census data shows significant improvements in its education system, with 50% of people having level 3 or above qualifications, compared to 33% in 2001.

There is no school in Haile, however; the closest primary school is Beckermet school, only 1.5 miles away, The closest secondary school is West Lakes Academy, 2.2. miles away.

Transport and attractions
 
On average in Haile more people work at home then compared to the rest of the country with 6.5%  compared to 3.5%. However, both in Cumbria and England, a lot more people travel less than 2 km to work than people in Haile. For example, in Cumbria 28.4% do so, whereas in Haile, it's only 8.5% of people. In terms of people travelling 40 km-plus to work, it follows a similar trend to England and Cumbria.

Crime

In Haile crime is relativity low, with an overall crime rate of 26.1 per 1000 population, compared to England with 37.6. In all cases Copeland District has lower crime rates than England, following a similar trend to Cumbria as a whole. Rates of robbery in Cumbria and Copeland are significantly lower than England, having only 0.1 per 1000 recorded, whereas it is 1.3 in England.

Sports and leisure

There are a range of sport facilities near Haile. The Egremont Rangers ARLFC is in close proximity, as well as Winscales Squash Club and Cumbria Golf Centre. The nearest gym is Fitness Factory Egremont.

See also

Listed buildings in Haile, Cumbria

References

External links
 Cumbria County History Trust: Haile (nb: provisional research only – see Talk page)

Villages in Cumbria
Civil parishes in Cumbria
Borough of Copeland